The Guinness family is an extensive Irish family known for its accomplishments in brewing, banking, politics, and religious ministry. The brewing branch is particularly well known among the general public for producing the dry stout Guinness Beer. The founder of the dynasty, Arthur Guinness, is confirmed to have had McCartan origins. Beginning in the late 18th century, they became a prominent part of what is known in Ireland as 'the Ascendancy'.

Four members of the family in succession held the UK Parliament constituency of Southend, which became popularly known as "Guinness-on-Sea".

The "banking line" Guinnesses all descend from Arthur's brother Samuel (1727–1795) who set up as a goldbeater in Dublin in 1750; his son Richard (1755–1830), a Dublin barrister; and Richard's son Robert Rundell Guinness who founded Guinness Mahon in 1836.

Prominent members

Richard Guinness
Arthur Guinness (1725–1803), founder of the Guinness brewery in 1759, married Olivia Whitmore
The Rev. Hosea Guinness (1765–1841)
Francis Hart Vicesimus Guinness (1819–1891), New Zealand magistrate 
Sir Arthur Guinness (1846–1913), Speaker of the New Zealand House of Representatives
The Second Arthur Guinness (1768–1855); married firstly Anne Lee, married secondly Maria Barker
Benjamin Guinness (1798–1868), married 
Arthur Guinness, 1st Baron Ardilaun (1840–1915), created Baron Ardilaun in 1880
Benjamin Lee Guinness (1842–1900)
Kenelm Lee Guinness (1887–1937), racing driver and spark plug manufacturer
Edward Guinness, 1st Earl of Iveagh (1847–1927)
Rupert Guinness, 2nd Earl of Iveagh (1874–1967), married Lady Gwendolen Onslow (1881–1966)
Arthur Guinness, Viscount Elveden (1912–1945)
Benjamin Guinness, 3rd Earl of Iveagh (1937–1992), married Miranda Smiley (1939–2010)
Arthur Edward Guinness, 4th Earl of Iveagh (Ned Iveagh; born 1969)
Lady Honor Guinness (1909–1976), married Henry Channon
Paul Channon (1935–2007)
Lady Brigid Guinness (1920–1995), married Prince Frederick of Prussia
Prince Frederick Nicholas of Prussia (born 3 May 1946), married Hon. Victoria Lucinda Mancroft (1952-)
Princess Antonia of Prussia (born 28 April 1955), married Charles Wellesley, 9th Duke of Wellington
Arthur Wellesley, Earl of Mornington (born 31 January 1978), married Jemma Kidd
The Hon. Arthur Ernest Guinness (1876–1949)
Aileen Guinness (1904–1999)
Maureen Guinness (1907–1998), married Basil Hamilton-Temple-Blackwood, 4th Marquess of Dufferin and Ava (1909–1945)
Sheridan Hamilton-Temple-Blackwood, 5th Marquess of Dufferin and Ava (1938–1988); married his fourth cousin Serena Belinda (Lindy) Rosemary Guinness
Lady Caroline Blackwood (1931–1996), married firstly Lucian Freud, second Israel Citkowitz, and thirdly Robert Lowell 
Oonagh Guinness (1910–1995), married Dominick Browne, 4th Baron Oranmore and Browne
Garech Browne (1939–2018)
Tara Browne (1945–1966)
Walter Edward Guinness, 1st Baron Moyne (1880–1944)
Bryan Guinness, 2nd Baron Moyne (1905–1992)
Jonathan Guinness, 3rd Baron Moyne (born 1930) married (1st) Ingrid Olivia Georgia Wyndham in 1951 (div. 1963), (2nd) Suzanne Lisney in 1964 and had three further children with Susan Mary Taylor.
(of 1st) The Hon. Catherine Ingrid Guinness (born 1952), married firstly in 1983 James Charteris - 13th Earl of Weymss, 13th Lord Elcho and Methil, 13th Lord Wemyss of Elcho, 9th Earl of March, 6th Baron Wemyss of Wemyss, co. Fife, 9th Lord Douglas of Neidpath, Lyne and Munard and 9th Viscount of Peebles]] and secondly to Robert Fleetwood Hesketh in 1990.
(of 1st) The Hon. Jasper Jonathon Richard Guinness (born 1954, died 2011), married Camilla Alexandra Uniacke in 1985.
(of 1st )The Hon. Valentine Guy Bryan Guinness (born 1959), married Lucinda "Lulu" Rivett-Carnac
(of 2nd) [The Hon. Sebastian Walter Denis Guinness] (born 1964) married firstly Silvie Dominique Fleury in 1987 and secondly, Peggy Stephaich in 1995.
(of 2nd) The Hon. Daphne Suzannah Diana Guinness (born 1967) married Spyros Niarchos in 1987 (div. 1999)
(of 3) [Diana Gloria Isolde Rose Dimilo Taylor] (born 1981) 
(of 3) [Aster Sophia Mary Taylor] (born 1984)
(of 3) [Thomas Julian William Jon Taylor] (born 1986)
Hon. Desmond Guinness (1931–2020)
Patrick Guinness (born 1958)
Jasmine Guinness (born 1976)
Marina Guinness
Patrick Guinness (born 1981)
Hon. Rosaleen Elisabeth Guinness (born 1937)
Hon. Diarmid Edward Guinness (born 1938)
Hon. Fiona Evelyn Guinness (born 1940)
Hon. Dr Finn Benjamin Guinness (born 1945)
Hon. Thomasin Margaret Guinness (born 1947)
Hon. Kieran Arthur Guinness (born 1949)
Malachy Guinness (born 1986)
Hon. Catriona Rose Guinness (born 1950)
Hon. Erskine Stuart Richard Guinness (born 1953)
Hon. Mirabel Jane Guinness (born 1956)
Hon. Grania Guinness (1920–1994), married Oswald Phipps, 4th Marquess of Normanby
Constantine Phipps, 5th Marquess of Normanby (born 1954)
Anne Guinness (1839–1889), married William Plunket, 4th Baron Plunket
William Plunket, 5th Baron Plunket (1864–1920)
Benjamin Plunket (born 1870)
Olive Plunket, married Peter Wentworth-Fitzwilliam, 8th Earl Fitzwilliam
Lady Juliet Wentworth-Fitzwilliam (born 1935); married firstly Victor Hervey, 6th Marquess of Bristol, secondly Somerset de Chair, and thirdly Dr. Christopher Tadgell
Lord Nicholas Hervey (1961–1998)
John Grattan Guinness (1783–1850)
John Grattan Guinness (died 1871)
Samuel Guinness (1851–1940)
James Henry Guinness (1879–1952)
Gerald Henry Grattan Guinness (1909–1985)
Ivor Grattan-Guinness (1941–2014)
Henry Grattan Guinness (1835–1910), Protestant missionary
Harry Grattan Guinness (1861–1915), Protestant missionary and first leader of Regions Beyond Missionary Union
Annie Geraldine ("Gudruna") Guinness (1888-1981), eldest child of 9, "widely traveled, the author of a book on Peru, a freethinking Christian, the mother of two children." Gudruna was influential in the early life and relationship of Sir Ronald Fisher and Ruth Eileen (Guinness) Fisher.
Ruth Eileen (Guinness) Fisher (1900-1982), youngest child of 9, wife of Sir Ronald Fisher, married April 26, 1917.
George Fisher (1919-1943), R.A.F. pilot, killed in action in the Mediterranean theater in late 1943 at age 24
Katie Fisher (1921-1921), died in infancy after surgery to remove a pebble from her lung (she inhaled it after an accident in which her toddler brother George poured pebbles in her mouth at the beach)
Harry Fisher (1924-2005)
Margaret Fisher (1925-2010)
Joan Fisher Box (b. 1926), author of R. A. Fisher: The Life of a Scientist
Phyllis Fisher (b. 1929)
Elizabeth Fisher (dates unknown)
Rose Fisher (dates unknown)
June Fisher (1929-1995), president of the National Union of Teachers
Howard Wyndham Guinness (1903–1979)
Gershom Whitfield Guinness (1869–1927), missionary in China
Henry Whitfield Guinness (1908–1996)
Os Guinness (born 1941)
Mary Geraldine Guinness Taylor (1865–1949), missionary in China and a writer
Samuel Guinness (died 1795)
Richard Guinness (1755–1829)
Robert Rundell Guinness (1789–1857), founder of Guinness Mahon
Richard Seymour Guinness (1826–1915)
Benjamin Seymour Guinness (1868–1947)
Thomas "Loel" Guinness (1906–1988), married Gloria Rubio y Alatorre (1913–1980)
Patrick Benjamin Guinness (1931–1965), married Dolores von Fürstenberg-Hedringen (1936–2012)
Maria Alexandra Guinness (born 1956), married Count de Quatrebarbes
Loel Patrick Guinness (born 1957)
Victoria Guinness (born 1960), now Victoria Niarchos by marrying Philip Niarchos 
William Loel Seymour Guinness (born 1939), married Agnes Elizabeth Lynn Guinness (born 1942)
Sheridan William Guinness (born 1972)
Thomas Seymour Guinness (born 1973)
Chloë Belinda Guinness (born 1976)
Serena Belinda (Lindy) Rosemary Guinness (born 1941), married her fourth cousin Sheridan Hamilton-Temple-Blackwood, 5th Marquess of Dufferin and Ava 
Meraud Guinness (1904–1993)
Tanis Guinness (1908–1993)
Henry Guinness (1829–1893)
Henry Guinness (1858–1945)
Judy Guinness (1910–1952) 
Lucy Guinness (1870-1950), married Philip de László (1869–1937)
Eustace Guinness (1860–1901)
Humphrey Patrick Guinness (1902–1986)
Howard Rundell Guinness (1863–1937)
Edward Douglas Guinness (1893–1983)
Sir Howard Christian Sheldon Guinness (1932–2019)
Sir John Guinness (1935–2020)
Sir Arthur Rundell Guinness (1895–1951)
James Edward Alexander Rundell Guinness (1924–2006)
Hugo Guinness (born 1959)
Sabrina Guinness (born 1955)
Anita Patience Guinness (born 1957), married Amschel Rothschild
Julia Samuel (born 1959)
Ivan Douglas Rundell Guinness (1927–1956)
Kevin Michael Rundell Guinness (born 1953), married Peta "Bunny" Ellis (born 1955)
Richard Noel Guinness (1870–1960)
Henry Eustace Guinness (1897–1972)
John Henry Guinness (1935–1988), married Jennifer Hollwey (1937–2016)
Mary Catherine Ferguson (1823–1905)
Richard Samuel Guinness (1797–1857), MP

See also
 Earl of Iveagh (created 1919)
 Baron Moyne (created 1932)
 Guinness Baronets
 Kenwood House
 Guinness Trust
 Lion's Gate Bridge
 St. James's Gate Brewery
 Guinness share-trading fraud
 Families in the Oireachtas
 Iveagh Trust
 Iveagh Gardens
 Iveagh House
 Farmleigh

Notes

Further reading
 Martelli, G. Man of his Time (London 1957)
 Lynch P. & Vaizey J. Guinness's Brewery in the Irish Economy, 1759–1876 (Cambridge 1960)
 Mullally, Frederic. The Silver Salver: The Story of the Guinness Family (Granada, 1981)
 Aalen, F. H. A. The Iveagh Trust The first hundred years 1890–1990 (Dublin 1990)
 Guinness, J. Requiem for a Family Business (Macmillan 1997)
 S. Dennison and O.MacDonagh, Guinness 1886–1939 From incorporation to the Second World War (Cork University Press 1998)
 Wilson, D. Dark and Light (Weidenfeld, London 1998)
 Bryant, J. Kenwood: The Iveagh Bequest (English Heritage publication 2004)
 Guinness, P. Arthur's Round (Peter Owen, London 2008)
 Joyce, J. The Guinnesses (Poolbeg Press, Dublin 2009)
 Bourke, Edward J. The Guinness Story: The Family, the Business and the Black Stuff (O'Brien Press, 2009). 
 Smith, R. Guinness Down Under; the famous brew and the family come to Australia and New Zealand (Eyeglass Press, Tauranga 2018).

External links
 www.guinnesspartnership.com/125
 http://www.guinness.com/
 https://web.archive.org/web/20080820023015/http://www.guinnesstrust.org.uk/
 Bicentennial essay by Bryan Guinness in The Times 20 November 1959; (reprinted in Eugenics Review, April 1960)

 
Irish families
Banking families